Together for Yes (TFY) is an abortion rights campaign group in Ireland. It campaigned successfully for a Yes vote in the 2018 referendum to ratify the Thirty-sixth Amendment, which removed the Eighth Amendment's constitutional ban on abortion in Ireland.

Membership
The group is an umbrella organisation, bringing together over 70 diverse civil society bodies. The core member groups with representatives on the board are:
 The National Women's Council of Ireland
 The Coalition to Repeal the 8th Amendment
 The Abortion Rights Campaign
 The Irish Family Planning Association

Additional groups include:
 Atheist Ireland
 Green Party
 Fine Gael
 Disability rights group, Inclusion Ireland
 Irish Council for Civil Liberties
 Labour Party
 Parents Together for Yes, also known as Parents for Choice in Pregnancy and Childbirth
 National LGBT Federation
 Workers' Party
 Sinn Féin
 SIPTU
 Social Democrats
 Union of Students in Ireland (USI)
 University College Dublin Students' Union

Fund-raising 
When the project was launched, a crowd-funding campaign was started, with a target of €50,000. This was met within hours, and reached €500,000 within four days. As of 26 April, Together for Yes had raised over €800,000.

Notes

References

External links 
 

2018 establishments in Ireland
Abortion-rights organisations in Ireland